Oss (Us) is a Norwegian post-apocalyptic disaster film from 1976 directed by Laila Mikkelsen. The film is based on a story by Knut Faldbakken.

Plot
The film is about the aftermath of an economic disaster as a result of poor countries stopping their exports of raw materials. In Norway and the Western world, this leads to unemployment, food shortages, and demonstrations. Many people head out to the countryside. Among these are Thomas and Vera, who end up renting a farm in a remote valley. Life there is not easy, and military forces seize the crops.

References

External links
 
 Oss at Filmfront
 Oss at the National Library of Norway

1976 films
Norwegian disaster films
Films set in the future
1970s dystopian films